Federico Antonio Pizarro (born January 1, 1927 in Buenos Aires, Argentina – died April 5, 2003 in Buenos Aires, Argentina) was an Argentine international footballer who played for clubs of Argentina and Chile. He played for the Argentina national football team in the Copa América Peru 1957.

Teams
 Chacarita Juniors 1947–1954
 San Lorenzo 1954–1957
 Huracán 1958
 Chacarita Juniors 1959
 Magallanes 1960

Titles
 Argentina 1957 (Copa América Peru 1957)
 Chacarita Juniors 1959 (Primera B Championship)

External links
 

1927 births
2003 deaths
Argentine footballers
Argentine expatriate footballers
Argentina international footballers
Chacarita Juniors footballers
San Lorenzo de Almagro footballers
Club Atlético Huracán footballers
Magallanes footballers
Expatriate footballers in Chile
Association football midfielders
Footballers from Buenos Aires